Asociația Sportivă Sportul 30 Decembrie, commonly known as Sportul 30 Decembrie, was a Romanian  football club based in 30 Decembrie commune (now 1 Decembrie), Ilfov County.

The club was financially supported by the farm from the 30 Decembrie commune, being the first team from Ilfov County to play in the second football division in România.

History
The club was founded in 1950 as Argeșul 30 Decembrie and played for almost thirty years in the regional and county championships. 

At the end of the 1982–83 season, Argeșul won the Giurgiu County Championship and promoted to Divizia C. 

After finishing eleventh in the first season in Divizia C, 1983–84, the club enter in partnership with Sportul Studențesc, subsequently changing its name to Sportul 30 Decembrie.

In the following two seasons, 1984–85 and 1985–86, Sportul, proved to be a serious contender for promotion, but each time it finished in 2nd place.

At the end of the 1986–87 season, with Nicolae Tănăsescu as head coach, Sportul 30 Decembrie promoted for the first time on the second division, at the goal difference, after a dramatic duel until the last round with Cimentul Medgidia. The squad was composed of: Dumitru Iordan, Adam – goalkeepers; Mihăilescu, Cristian Barbu, Alexandru Lazăr, Dorel Ciobanu, Paul Dumitru, Niculescu, Stănescu – defenders; Cristian Niță, Ion Pop, Pîslaru, Nignea, Constantin Covaciu, Pîrvan, Marinescu, Mărgelatu – midfielders; Aurel Vișinoiu, Neagu, G. Dumitru, Huțanu, Rădulescu – forwards.

In Divizia B, with a new coach, Romulus Chihaia, former player of Sportul Studențesc, the team from the small locality near Bucharest finished, two seasons in a row, 1987–88 and 1988–89, on the 6th place.

Two more good seasons follow, each time in the first part of the standings, 5th - 1989–90 and 4th - 1990–91.

The following season, 1991–92, was disappointing, seeing Sportul 30 Decembrie relegated, as they managed just five victories and finished on the last position in 2nd series of the second division.

Following relegation, the club merged with the newly promoted in Divizia C, from Giurgiu County Championship, Rapid Braniștea, forming Sportul Studențesc Agrarian Braniștea.

During all these years, many young promising footballers or some at the end of their careers such as Cristian Petre, Gabriel Răduță, Gabriel Prodan, Cătălin Necula, Florin Motroc, Daniel Dumitrescu, Hristu Mihale, Marin Ivașcu, Imilian Șerbănică was loaned from Sportul Studențesc.

Honours
Divizia C
Winners (1): 1986–87
Runners-up (2): 1984–85, 1985–86

Giurgiu County Championship
Winners (1): 1982–83

League history

References

Association football clubs established in 1950
Association football clubs disestablished in 1992
Defunct football clubs in Romania
Football clubs in Ilfov County
Sport in Ilfov County
Liga II clubs
1950 establishments in Romania
1992 disestablishments in Romania